The 2017 Hero Tri-Nation Series was a 3-team association football tournament held at the Mumbai Football Arena in the Indian city of Mumbai between the 19th and 24th of August 2017. The tournament was organized by the AIFF as part of the senior men team's preparation for the third round of 2019 AFC Asian Cup qualification matches.  The tournament naming rights were purchased by Hero MotoCorp which also sponsors the national team. The tournament received criticism from at least one media outlet, citing that the ₹3.7cr spent to organize the tournament was significantly more than the entire yearly budget for the women's national team. The tournament was originally scheduled to take place at the Jawaharlal Nehru Stadium in Chennai but was changed the week before the tournament because of financial disagreements with the stadium's operators. India Head coach Stephen Constantine revealed that the intention was to hold a 4-team tournament with India competing against teams from the Caribbean, Africa, and Asia. However another Asian team did not participate. India won the tournament with a 1–1 draw with Saint Kitts and Nevis on the final matchday.

Participating nations 
With FIFA Rankings, as of August 10, 2017 
 (97)
 (125)
 (160)

Standings

Matches

Winners

Goalscorers
1 goal

 Balwant Singh 
 Jackichand Singh 
 Robin Singh 
 Mervyn Jocelyn
 Jean Frederic Sarah
 G'Vaune Amory
 Kimaree Rogers

References

August 2017 sports events in Asia
2017 in association football
International association football competitions hosted by India